NSPR:

 Netscape Portable Runtime, abstraction library for Mozilla-like web-browsers
 North State Public Radio, California State University, Chico radio broadcaster, in Northern California